Raymond Pierre (born September 19, 1967) is a former American track and field athlete, who competed in the sprinting events during his career. Pierre won the 1989 NCAA 400 meters running for Baylor University. He is best known for winning the men's  400-meter dash event at the 1987 Pan American Games.

He also won silver medals in the 4×400 m relay at the 1989 IAAF World Cup (with Antonio Pettigrew among others) and at the 1991 IAAF World Indoor Championships alongside Charles Jenkins, Andrew Valmon and Antonio McKay. He was the alternate relay runner at the 1987 World Championships in Athletics, helping the United States team qualify into the final with a championship record of 2:59.06 minutes, which the team later improved upon in their gold medal winning run.

Pierre is also recognized as an outstanding track starter having served in that position for many years for the NCAA Championships, Big 12 Conference Championships, Baylor's Michael Johnson Invitational and the Texas Relays, among other Meets.

References
trackfield.brinkster

1967 births
Living people
American male sprinters
Athletes (track and field) at the 1987 Pan American Games
Pan American Games gold medalists for the United States
Pan American Games medalists in athletics (track and field)
Universiade medalists in athletics (track and field)
Universiade gold medalists for the United States
World Athletics Indoor Championships medalists
World Athletics Championships winners
Medalists at the 1987 Summer Universiade
Medalists at the 1989 Summer Universiade
Medalists at the 1987 Pan American Games